The Brazil national under-20 football team, also known as Brazil Sub-20 or Seleção Sub-20, represents Brazil in association football at this age level and is controlled by the Brazilian Football Confederation (CBF).

The team has won the South American Youth Championship a record eleven times and is the second most successful nation in the FIFA U-20 World Cup, having won the competition five times. It also plays in unofficial under-19 and under-21 tournaments, such as the Toulon Tournament, of which Brazil is an eight-time winner.

Notable players that came through the ranks and went on to play for the senior team include Ronaldinho, Kaká, Rivaldo, Romário, Marcos, Roberto Carlos, César Sampaio, Cláudio Taffarel, Bebeto, Dida, Neymar, Dani Alves, Maicon, Adriano, Júlio Baptista, Luisão, Alex, Giovane Élber, Leonardo, Müller, Silas, Marcelo, David Luiz, Willian, Jô and Lucas Moura, among others.

Competitive record

FIFA U-20 World Cup record

South American Youth Championship record

Current squad
The following 22 players were called up for the 2023 South American U-20 Championship.

Top goalscorers

Individual awards
 FIFA U-20 World Cup

Honours

 FIFA U-20 World Cup:
 Winners (5): 1983, 1985, 1993, 2003, 2011
 Runners-up (4): 1991, 1995, 2009, 2015
 South American Youth Championship:
 Winners (12): 1974, 1983, 1985, 1989, 1991, 1993, 1995, 2001, 2007, 2009, 2011, 2023
 Runners-up (7): 1954, 1977, 1981, 1987, 1997, 2003, 2005

Friendlies
 Tournoi Juniors de Cannes:
Winners (4): 1971, 1972, 1973, 1974
 Tournament of the Crown Prince:
 Winners: 1978
 Toulon Tournament:
 Winners (8): 1980, 1981, 1983, 1995, 1996, 2002, 2013, 2014
 Torneio Internacional de Ribeirão Preto:
 Winners: 1981
 Beijing Youth Tournament:
Winners: 1986
 Qatar Friendship Tournament:
Winners: 1987
 COTIF:
 Winners (3): 1990, 2002, 2014
 Copa Gobernador del Estado Carabobo:
Winners: 1992
 Val-Action Cup:
Winners: 1993
 King's Cup:
 Winners: 1999
 Mediterranean International Cup U-20:
 Winners (5): 2001, 2003, 2004, 2006, 2010
 Mediterranean International Cup U-18:
 Winners (9): 2001, 2002, 2003, 2004, 2006, 2007, 2008, 2010, 2011
 TyC Asia Cup:
 Winners: 2001
 Oman International Tournament:
 Winners: 2002
 Malaysia International Tournament:
 Winners: 2003
 Sendai Cup:
 Winners (6): 2003, 2005, 2006, 2008, 2009, 2010
 SBS Cup:
 Winners: 2004
 Valais Youth Cup:
 Winners: 2013
 Panda Cup:
 Winners: 2014
 Talca International Tournament:
 Winners: 2016
 Torneio Quadrangular de Teresópolis:
 Winners: 2020
 Torneio Internacional do Espírito Santo:
 Winners: 2022

See also 
 South American Youth Championship
 Brazil national football team
 Brazil Olympic football team
 Brazil national under-17 football team
 Santos FC and the Brazil national football team

References 

 

Youth football in Brazil
South American national under-20 association football teams
Under-20